Boknafjord or Boknafjorden is a fjord located in Rogaland county, Norway.  The huge fjord lies between the cities of Stavanger and Haugesund and dominates the central part of the county. The main part of the fjord is shared between the municipalities of Kvitsøy, Stavanger, Tysvær, Bokn, and Karmøy.  There are dozens of smaller fjords that branch off the main part of the fjord, reaching most municipalities in the county.  At its longest, the Boknafjord reaches about  into the mainland at the innermost point of the Hylsfjorden.  Other notable branches include the Saudafjorden, Sandsfjorden, Vindafjorden, Hervikfjorden, Førresfjorden, Erfjorden, Jøsenfjorden, Årdalsfjorden, Idsefjorden, Høgsfjorden, Lysefjorden, and Gandsfjorden.

The vast fjord is quite wide, and it has many islands located within its shores, some of which are quite large.  Some of the notable islands include Vestre Bokn, Kvitsøy, Rennesøy, Ombo, Finnøy, Mosterøy, and the Sjernarøyane archipelago.

Tunnel
The Rogfast sub-sea tunnel is a huge tunnel project that will construct a tunnel under the Boknafjord and the Kvitsøyfjord connecting the cities of Stavanger and Haugesund and ultimately becoming part of a ferry-free highway system along the western coast of Norway. It will also connect the island municipality of Kvitsøy to the mainland by road. Construction began in 2018. It will be the longest and deepest underwater road tunnel in the world.

References

External links
 E39 Rogfast 

Fjords of Rogaland
Stavanger
Bokn
Karmøy
Tysvær